The Port Republic School District is a community public school district that serves students in kindergarten through eighth grade from Port Republic, in Atlantic County, New Jersey, United States.

As of the 2018–19 school year, the district, comprising one school, had an enrollment of 104 students and 15.5 classroom teachers (on an FTE basis), for a student–teacher ratio of 6.7:1. In the 2016–17 school year, Port Republic was the 12th-smallest enrollment of any school district in the state, with 118 students.

The district is classified by the New Jersey Department of Education as being in District Factor Group "FG", the fourth-highest of eight groupings. District Factor Groups organize districts statewide to allow comparison by common socioeconomic characteristics of the local districts. From lowest socioeconomic status to highest, the categories are A, B, CD, DE, FG, GH, I and J.

Students in ninth through twelfth grades attend Cedar Creek High School, which is located in the northern section of Egg Harbor City and opened to students in September 2010. The school is one of three high schools operated as part of the Greater Egg Harbor Regional High School District, which also includes the constituent municipalities of Egg Harbor City, Galloway Township, Hamilton Township, and Mullica Township, and participates in sending/receiving relationships with Port Republic and Washington Township (Burlington County). Cedar Creek High School is zoned to serve students from Egg Harbor City, Mullica Township, Port Republic and Washington Township, while students in portions of Galloway and Hamilton townships have the opportunity to attend Cedar Creek through the school of choice program or through attendance in magnet programs offered at Cedar Creek. As of the 2018–19 school year, the high school had an enrollment of 930 students and 73.4 classroom teachers (on an FTE basis), for a student–teacher ratio of 12.7:1.

Schools
Port Republic Elementary School served 101 students (as of the 2018–19 school year, per the National Center for Education Statistics.)

Administration
Core members of the district's administration are:
Brian Z. London, Superintendent Principal
Todd D'Anna, Business Administrator / Board Secretary

Board of education
The district's board of education has five members who set policy and oversee the fiscal and educational operation of the district through its administration. As a Type I school district, the board's trustees are appointed by the Mayor to serve three-year terms of office on a staggered basis, with either one or two members up for reappointment each year. Of the more than 600 school districts statewide, Port Republic is one of 15 districts with appointed school districts.

References

External links
Port Republic School District

Port Republic School District, National Center for Education Statistics
Oakcrest High School website
Greater Egg Harbor Regional High School District

Port Republic, New Jersey
New Jersey District Factor Group FG
School districts in Atlantic County, New Jersey
Public K–8 schools in New Jersey